Dermott Petty is an independent filmmaker from Lisdoonvarna, County Clare in Ireland.

Film career
In 1998 Petty won a Dramalogue Award for his stage direction of The Midnight Court. He produced a television pilot detailing his early experiences as an emigrant entitled Dot Ave, and a documentary about traditional Irish Ceilidh dancing called A Gathering. He was a recipient of a grant from the Irish Film Board for his script, The Prodigal Dancer.

He wrote and directed a short film entitled Paddy Takes A Meeting which played at the Galway Film Fleadh and at film festivals worldwide. He also made a short documentary, The Last Chance Saloon, which won an award at the VOV Film Festival in Los Angeles.

Petty made the feature film Manband!, a comedy on ageism, boy-bands and bad dancing which played at the Rat Powered Film Festival in Santa Ana, California, at Chapman University in Orange, California and at the Glor Music Center in Ennis, Ireland.

He created the first Irish Spaghetti Western with Sean Nós Dancing with the short film 'The Good the Bad & the Sean Nós Dancer' as a media prototype for his MA In Creative Media at the Tralee Institute of Technology in 2013. The Good the Bad & the Sean Nós Dancer

He has written and directed Animation. Starting with 'Jesus of Limerick'(2009) The Man From Q web series (2013) and 'the Leprechaun & the Stripper'(2015) web series The Leprechaun & the Stripper.

Filmography

References

External links
 

Living people
Irish film directors
Year of birth missing (living people)